Association Sportive Montferrandaise Football is the football section of AS Montferrand Omnisports, a French multi-sport club based in Clermont-Ferrand. Founded in 1911, the club terminated the senior football team in 2005. As of 2022, AS Montferrand Football has approximately 450 employees and 28 male and female youth teams from the ages of 6 to 19.

Honours

Notable former players 

  Daniel Gbaguidi
  Naël Jaby
  Jonathan Millieras
  Yacouba Sylla
  Benoît Tardieu
  Gaëtan Varenne
  Hans Venneker
  Christian Zajaczkowski

References 

 
Defunct football clubs in France
Sport in Clermont-Ferrand
1911 establishments in France
Association football clubs established in 1911
2005 disestablishments in France
Association football clubs disestablished in 2005
Football clubs in Auvergne-Rhône-Alpes